Majid Ayoubi; is an Iranian Football defender who currently plays for Iranian football club Qashqai Shiraz in the Azadegan League.

Club career

Early years
Ayoubi started his career with Shamoushak from youth levels. He also spent few seasons with Nassaji.

Saipa
He joined Saipa in summer 2001 and since then he has been a regular player of the club. In June 2014 he extended for another two years with Saipa.

Club career statistics

Honours

Club
Saipa
Iran Pro League (1): 2006–07

References

External links
 Majid Ayoubi at IranLeague.ir

1980 births
Living people
Iranian footballers
Saipa F.C. players
Sanat Mes Kerman F.C. players
Naft Masjed Soleyman F.C. players
Persian Gulf Pro League players
Sportspeople from Mazandaran province
Association football defenders